Frank D. Beadle (February 16, 1899 – June 2, 1983) was a politician from Michigan who served as the first Majority Leader of the Michigan Senate.

Beadle was involved in the insurance and real estate business prior to his election to the Senate. During his tenure in the Senate, Beadle was a member of the Appropriations Committee.

References

1899 births
1983 deaths
People from Sanilac County, Michigan
Republican Party Michigan state senators
United States Marine Corps personnel of World War I
20th-century American politicians